La Bella Durmiente (Spanish for Sleeping Beauty), also known as Puma Ringri (possibly from Quechua puma cougar, puma, rinri ear, "puma ear"), is a mountain and prominent feature of Tingo María National Park, in the region of Huánuco, Peru.

Name 
The name comes from the shape of the mountain, which resembles a woman lying down, and is present in a local folktale.

References 

Mountains of Peru
Mountains of Huánuco Region